Burnt by Frost is a 1997 Norwegian drama film directed by Knut Erik Jensen, starring Stig Henrik Hoff and Gørild Mauseth. Simon (Stig Henrik Hoff) helps a group of Soviet partisans during World War II. After the war is over, he is recruited as a Soviet spy.

External links
 
 Brent av frost at Filmweb.no (Norwegian)
 Brent av frost at the Norwegian Film Institute

1997 films
1997 drama films
Norwegian drama films